The 2004 Molson Indy Vancouver was the seventh round of the 2004 Bridgestone Presents the Champ Car World Series Powered by Ford season, held on July 25, 2004 on the streets of Concord Pacific Place in Vancouver, British Columbia, Canada.  Paul Tracy swept the pole and the race win.  It was the last Champ Car event to take place in Vancouver.

Qualifying results

Race

* Gastón Mazzacane crashed on the pace lap and did not take the green flag.

Caution flags

Notes

 New Race Record Paul Tracy 1:34:42.849
 Average Speed 95.900 mph

Championship standings after the race

Drivers' Championship standings

 Note: Only the top five positions are included.

References

External links
 Full Weekend Times & Results
 Friday Qualifying Results
 Saturday Qualifying Results
 Race Box Score

Vancouver
Indy Vancouver
Molson
2004 in British Columbia